Eifel is a low mountain range in Germany, Luxembourg and Belgium

Eifel may also refer to:

Places
 Eifel Park (disambiguation), multiple parks
 volcanic Eifel, a region of Germany
 Eifel hotspot, a volcanic formation in Germany
 Eifel Formation, a Palaeogene geologic formation in Germany

Facilities and structures
 Eifel Aqueduct, one of the longest aqueducts of the Roman Empire
 Eifel Railway, in Germany
 Eifel Transmitter, Scharteberg, Vulkaneifel, Rhineland-Palatinate, Germany; an FM and TV transmitter
 Eifel Park, Gondorf, Bitburg-Prüm, Rhineland-Palatinate, Germany; a wildlife park

Other uses
 Eifel dialects, dialects of German spoken in the Eifel mountains
 Eifel Rule, a linguistic phenomenon documented in the Eifel dialects
 Eifel Grand Prix, a Formula One grand prix, raced in the Eifel region of Germany
 Ford Eifel (1935-1940), a car made by Ford Germany
 Eifel Club, a rambling club in Germany
 , a German fishing trawler in service 1930–41 and 1945–54 which served as the vorpostenboot V 313 Eifel 1941–45

See also

 8665 Daun-Eifel, a main belt asteroid
 Belgian Eifel, a linguistic and geographic region of Belgium
 Voreifel, a region of Germany
 High Eifel, a region of the mountain range
 North Eifel, a region of the mountain range
 South Eifel, a region of the mountain range
 East Eifel, a region of the mountain range
 West Eifel, a region of the mountain range
 Cross Eifel Railway, in Germany
 Lahn-Eifel-Bahn, a passenger rail service in Germany
 Battle of the Schnee Eifel (1944) a WWII battle
 
 Jean Effel (1908–1982), French painter, caricaturist, illustrator and journalist
 Eiffel (disambiguation)